Torupilli (Estonian for "Pipe Instrument", after a type of bagpipe) is a subdistrict in the district of Kesklinn (Midtown), Tallinn, the capital of Estonia. It has a population of 3,729.

References

Subdistricts of Tallinn
Kesklinn, Tallinn